() was a Finnish military brigade in 1918–1919, the second group of Finnish volunteers to enlist to take part in the Estonian War of Independence, closely following behind the  regiment led by Colonel Martin Ekström.

Pohjan pojat fought under the command of Estonian Lieutenant Colonel Hans Kalm on the southern front in Estonia. Pohjan Pojat was the only Finnish military unit that progressed outside the Estonian national borders in the Estonian War of Independence.

Establishment 
As soon as the Finnish Commission for helping Estonia had decided on the formation of volunteer forces, Hans Kalm started recruiting volunteers. He published direct and emotional recruitment announcements in newspapers on December 23, 1918, in which he appealed to his comrades-in-arms during the Finnish Civil War. The announcements called on Finns to fight for humanity, justice, the freedom of the homeland and the fraternal people.

The Finnish Commission for helping Estonia had decided that no more than a thousand men should be sent to Estonia. However, as an Estonian, Kalm did not care about this and gathered 2213 men and 400 officials for the campaign. He formed a brigade that consisted of two infantry battalions and three artillery batteries supported by communication, cavalry and skiing departments. The force got its name from the slogan of the Hakkapeliittas: ”Hakkaa päälle, pohjan poika!” ("strike upon [them], son of the north!"). The regiment's flag had a picture of a polar bear, and the colours were based on a Finnish state flag.

Battles 

Pohjan pojat crossed the Gulf of Finland on January 12, 1919. Their first battle was near Paju Manor (German: Luhde-Grosshof) against a heavily armed Red Army Latvian sniper battalion on 31 January. The mansion was conquered in the evening by a plunge. The first battalion in charge of the fighting suffered heavy losses, losing one officer, two non-commissioned officers and 21 soldiers. 39 were wounded.

Next they took over Valki on February 1. The first battalion fought on the Estonian side against a Latvian sniper battalion in Koikküla. After this, the volunteer force was tasked with remaining in the reserve in Valki, until it would be ordered to proceed to northern Latvia.

However, Kalm didn't want to wait longer and ordered the attack on 16 February 1919 on the town of Marienburg (Alūksne) in northern Latvia. The troops were not in favor to cross the border to Latvia. Despite this, the force set out on 19 February, with the exception of the protesting Wäinö Havas' first company. On the evening of February 20, Finns arrived near Marienburg tired and in poor equipment. At dusk on February 21, the Finns launched an attack on Marienburg without additional support. In the evening, after a long and persistent firing, the Finns invaded the west side of the town and captured it with a bayonet attack. The losses were three officers and 15 soldiers, and a total of 40 men were killed due to illnesses. The captured Bolsheviks were shot, after which the city was looted as war booty. Estonian armored trains arrived on February 22, and the next day Estonian troops took full possession of the village.

On February 24, after the conquest parade, the Finns left Marienburg. They returned to the Estonian side in Valki on February 26.

Last battles 
In mid-March 1919, the Pohjan pojat were sent to Setomaa on the Petseri front, where the Bolsheviks had launched a counterattack. The Finns fought a consuming and severe station war in the area until the end of the month, when they returned to Valki on March 29. Last battles cost 27 fallen, eight missing and nearly 100 wounded.

References 

Estonian War of Independence